The Deputed Testamony Stakes is an American Thoroughbred horse race held in February at Laurel Park Racecourse in Laurel, Maryland. It is open to Maryland-bred three-year-olds and is run at one mile (8 furlongs) on the dirt. The race was run for the 28th time in 2012.

An ungraded stakes, it offers a purse of $100,000.  The Deputed Testamony Stakes is also one of Maryland's Triple Crown prep races. The winner of the race typically moves on to compete in the Private Terms Stakes held in March at Laurel Park Racecourse as well, but winners have also gone to New York and Kentucky for their next races.

The race was named in honor of Deputed Testamony, the 1983 Preakness Stakes winner and the last Maryland-bred champion three-year-old colt. Deputed Testamony was the son of Traffic Cop out of the mare Proof Requested. Traffic Cop was standing at Bonita Farm, so Deputed Testamony was bred, born, raced, retired, stood and pensioned at the same farm. He was bred and owned by his trainer, J. William (Bill) Boniface.

On Preakness Day 1984, Deputed Testamony won the City of Baltimore Handicap and set a new track record for  miles in 1:40.40. That race was the colt's final start. He was then retired to stud duty at Bonita Farm. He made twenty trips to the post in his career and won eleven times with four seconds and earnings of $674,324. Deputed Testamony became one of Maryland's top sires. He was pensioned from stud duty after the 2004 breeding season and died at Bonita Farm on September 18, 2012 at 32 years of age.

Records 
 
Speed record: 
  miles - 1:44.80 - Magic Weisner (2002) 
  miles - 1:49.20 - Acres (2000)

Most wins by an owner:
 no owner has won the Deputed Testamony Stakes more than once

Most wins by a jockey:
 2 - Edgar Prado    (1994 & 1997)

Most wins by a trainer:
 no trainer has the Deputed Testamony Stakes more than once

Winners of the Deputed Testamony Stakes since 1986

See also 
 Deputed Testamony Stakes "top three finishers"
 Laurel Park Racecourse

References

External links
 Laurel Park website

1986 establishments in Maryland
Triple Crown Prep Races
Laurel Park Racecourse
Horse races in Maryland
Recurring sporting events established in 1986